"God is dead" (also known as the death of God) is a statement made by the German philosopher Friedrich Nietzsche. Nietzsche's first use of this statement is his 1882 The Gay Science, where it appears three times. The phrase also appears in Nietzsche's Thus Spoke Zarathustra.

The meaning of this statement is that since, as Nietzsche says, "the belief in the Christian God has become unbelievable", everything that was "built upon this faith, propped up by it, grown into it", including "the whole [...] European morality", is bound to "collapse".

Other philosophers had previously discussed the concept, including Philipp Mainländer and Georg Wilhelm Friedrich Hegel. Proponents of the strongest form of the Death of God theology have used the phrase in a literal sense, meaning that the Christian God who had existed at one point has ceased to exist.

Early usage 
Discourses of a "death of God" in German culture appear as early as the 17th century and originally referred to Lutheran theories of atonement. The phrase "God is dead" appears in the hymn "Ein Trauriger Grabgesang" ("A mournful dirge") by Johann von Rist.

Before Nietzsche, the phrase 'Dieu est mort!' was written in Gérard de Nerval's 1854 poem "Le Christ aux oliviers" ("Christ at the olive trees"). The poem is an adaptation into a verse of a dream-vision that appears in Jean Paul's 1797 novel Siebenkäs under the chapter title of 'The Dead Christ Proclaims That There Is No God'. In an address he gave in 1987 to the American Academy of Arts and Sciences, the literary scholar George Steiner claims that Nietzsche's formulation 'God is dead' is indebted to the aforementioned 'Dead Christ' dream-vision of Jean Paul, but he offers no concrete evidence that Nietzsche ever read Jean Paul. 

The phrase is also found in a passage expressed by a narrator in Victor Hugo's 1862 novel Les Misérables:

Buddhist philosopher K. Satchidananda Murty wrote in The Realm of Between published by the Indian Institute of Advanced Study in 1973, that, coming across in a hymn of Martin Luther what Hegel described as "the cruel words", "the harsh utterance", namely, "God is dead", developed the theme of God's death according to whom, to one form of experience, God is dead. Murty continued that commenting on Kant's first Critique, Heinrich Heine who had purportedly influenced Nietzsche spoke of a dying God. Since Heine and Nietzsche the phrase Death of God became popular.

German philosophy

Hegel 
Contemporary historians believe that 19th-century German idealist philosophers, especially those associated with Georg Wilhelm Friedrich Hegel, are responsible for removing the specifically Christian resonance of the phrase relating to the death of Jesus Christ and associating it with secular philosophical and sociological theories.

Although the statement and its meaning are attributed to Nietzsche, Hegel had discussed the concept of the death of God in his Phenomenology of Spirit, where he considers the death of God to "Not be seen as anything but an easily recognized part of the usual Christian cycle of redemption". Later on Hegel writes about the great pain of knowing that God is dead: "The pure concept, however, or infinity, as the abyss of nothingness in which all being sinks, must characterize the infinite pain, which previously was only in culture historically and as the feeling on which rests modern religion, the feeling that God Himself is dead, (the feeling which was uttered by Pascal, though only empirically, in his saying: Nature is such that it marks everywhere, both in and outside of man, a lost God), purely as a phase, but also as no more than just a phase, of the highest idea."

Hegel's student Richard Rothe, in his 1837 theological text Die Anfänge der christlichen Kirche und ihrer Verfassung, appears to be one of the first philosophers to associate the idea of a death of God with the sociological theory of secularization.

Stirner 
German philosopher Max Stirner, whose influence on Nietzsche is debated, writes in his 1844 book The Ego and its Own that "the work of the Enlightenment, the vanquishing of God: they did not notice that man has killed God in order to become now - 'sole God on high.

Mainländer 
Before Nietzsche, the concept was popularized in philosophy by the German philosopher Philipp Mainländer.

It was while reading Mainländer that Nietzsche explicitly writes to have parted ways with Schopenhauer. In Mainländer's more than 200 pages long criticism of Schopenhauer's metaphysics, he argues against one cosmic unity behind the world, and champions a real multiplicity of wills struggling with each other for existence. Yet, the interconnection and the unitary movement of the world, which are the reasons that lead philosophers to pantheism, are undeniable. They do indeed lead to a unity, but this may not be at the expense of a unity in the world that undermines the empirical reality of the world. It is therefore declared to be dead.

Nietzsche 
In The Gay Science, "God is dead" is first mentioned in "New Struggles":

Still in The Gay Science, the expression is stated  into the mouth of a "madman", in "The Madman", as follows:

In the madman passage, the madman is described as running through a marketplace shouting, "I seek God! I seek God!" He arouses some amusement; no one takes him seriously. "Maybe he took an ocean voyage? Lost his way like a little child? Maybe he's afraid of us (non-believers) and is hiding?" – much laughter. Frustrated, the madman smashes his lantern on the ground, crying out that "God is dead, and we have killed him, you and I!". "But I have come too soon", he immediately realizes, as his detractors of a minute before stare in astonishment: people cannot yet see that they have killed God. He goes on to say:

Lastly, "The Meaning of our Cheerfulness" section of The Gay Science discusses what "God is dead" means ("that the belief in the Christian God has become unworthy of belief"), and the consequences of this fact.

In Thus Spoke Zarathustra, at the end of the section 2 of Zarathustra's prologue, after beginning his allegorical journey, Zarathustra encounters an aged ascetic who expresses misanthropy and love of God (a "saint"). Nietzsche writes:

What is more, Zarathustra later not only refers to the death of God but states: "Dead are all the Gods."

Explanations 
Nietzsche recognized the crisis that this "Death of God" represented for existing moral assumptions in Europe as they existed within the context of traditional Christian belief. "When one gives up the Christian faith, one pulls the right to Christian morality out from under one's feet. This morality is by no means self-evident [...] By breaking one main concept out of Christianity, the faith in God, one breaks the whole: nothing necessary remains in one's hands."

Interpretation 
Martin Heidegger understood this aspect of Nietzsche's philosophy by looking at it as the death of metaphysics. In his view, Nietzsche's words can only be understood as referring not to a particular theological or anthropological view but rather to the end of philosophy itself. Philosophy has, in Heidegger's words, reached its maximum potential as metaphysics and Nietzsche's words warn of its demise and the end of any metaphysical worldview. If metaphysics is dead, Heidegger warns, that is because from its inception that was its fate.

Death of God theology 

Although theologians since Nietzsche had occasionally used the phrase "God is dead" to reflect increasing unbelief in God, the concept rose to prominence in the late 1950s and 1960s, subsiding in the early 1970s. The German-born theologian Paul Tillich, for instance, was influenced by the writings of Nietzsche, especially his phrase "God is dead."

William Hamilton wrote the following about American radical theologian Thomas J. J. Altizer's redeployment of Nietzsche's view:

See also 

 Philosophy of Friedrich Nietzsche
 Apollonian and Dionysian

 Christian atheism
 Postmodern Christianity
 Nontheism
 Postmodernity
 Post-theism
 Post-monotheism
 Faith and rationality
 Theories about religions

Notes

References

Further reading
 Nietzsche's philosophy
Heidegger, Martin.  (1943) translated as "The Word of Nietzsche: 'God Is Dead,'" in Holzwege, ed. and trans. Julian Young and Kenneth Haynes. Cambridge University Press, 2002.
Kaufmann, Walter. Nietzsche: Philosopher, Psychologist, Antichrist. Princeton: Princeton University Press, 1974.
 Roberts, Tyler T. Contesting Spirit: Nietzsche, Affirmation, Religion. Princeton: Princeton University Press, 1998.
Benson, Bruce E. Pious Nietzsche: Decadence and Dionysian Faith. Bloomington: Indiana University Press, 2008.
 Holub, Robert C. Friedrich Nietzsche. New York: Twayne, 1995.
 Magnus, Bernd, and Kathleen Higgins. The Cambridge Companion to Nietzsche. Cambridge: Cambridge University Press, 1996.
 Pfeffer, Rose. Nietzsche: Disciple of Dionysus. Canbury: Associated University Presses, 1972.
 Welshon, Rex. The Philosophy of Nietzsche. Montreal: McGill-Queen's UP, 2004.

 Death of God theology
Thinking through the Death of God: A Critical Companion to Thomas J. J. Altizer, ed. Lissa McCullough and Brian Schroeder. Albany: State University of New York Press, 2004. 
John D. Caputo and Gianni Vattimo, After the Death of God, ed. Jeffrey W. Robbins. New York: Columbia University Press, 2007. 
Resurrecting the Death of God: The Origins, Influence, and Return of Radical Theology, ed. Daniel J. Peterson and G. Michael Zbaraschuk. Albany: State University of New York Press, 2014.
John M. Frame, "Death of God Theology"

External links

Antitheism
Atheism
English phrases
Philosophy of Friedrich Nietzsche
Philosophical phrases
Quotations from philosophy
Nihilism
Death of God theology
German philosophy